Deceiver of the People is a 1921 German silent film directed by Reinhold Schünzel and starring Charles Willy Kayser, Rita Clermont and Margarete Schlegel.

Cast
 Charles Willy Kayser
 Rita Clermont
 Margarete Schlegel
 Fred Goebel
 Kurt Brenkendorf
 Josef Commer
 Richard Georg
 Adele Hartwig
 Ludwig Rex

References

Bibliography
 Bock, Hans-Michael & Bergfelder, Tim. The Concise CineGraph. Encyclopedia of German Cinema. Berghahn Books, 2009.

External links

1921 films
Films of the Weimar Republic
German silent feature films
Films directed by Reinhold Schünzel
German black-and-white films
1920s German films